The Maserati GranTurismo and GranCabrio are a series of a grand tourers produced by the Italian automobile manufacturer Maserati. They succeeded the 2-door V8 grand tourers offered by the company, the Maserati Coupé, and Spyder. 



GranTurismo I (M145, 2007~2019)

The first generation of Maserati GranTurismo (Tipo M145) was unveiled at the 2007 Geneva Motor Show, and was built between 2007 and December 2019. The GranTurismo set a record for the most quickly developed car in the auto industry, going from design to production stage in just nine months. The reason being that the proposed replacement for the Maserati Coupé looked like it was going to be too expensive to manufacture by Maserati and FIAT Chrysler Automobiles' Ferrari division needed a small car in its range and so it was launched as the Ferrari California instead, leaving Maserati without a coupe in its range. A total of 28,805 GranTurismo coupe were produced.

GranTurismo (2007–2019)

The model was initially equipped with a 4.2-litre V8 engine developed in conjunction with Ferrari. The 2+2 body was derived from the Maserati M139 platform, also shared with the Maserati Quattroporte V, with double-wishbone front suspension and a multilink rear suspension. The grand tourer emphasises comfort in harmony with speed and driver-enjoyment. The GranTurismo has a drag coefficient of 0.33.

GranTurismo S (2008–2012)

At the time of its introduction, it was the most powerful road-legal Maserati offered for sale (excluding the homologation special MC12). The engine is mated to the 6-speed automated manual built by Graziano Trasmissioni and shared with the Ferrari F430. With the transaxle layout weight distribution improved to 47% front and 53% rear. The standard suspension set-up is fixed-setting steel dampers, with the Skyhook adaptive suspension available as an option along with a new exhaust system, and upgraded Brembo brakes. The seats were also offered with various leather and Alcantara trim options. Aside from the power upgrades, the car featured new side skirts, unique 20-inch wheels unavailable on the standard car, a small boot lip spoiler, and black headlight clusters in place of the original silver. The variant was available in the North American market only for MY2009 with only 300 units offered for sale.

GranTurismo MC (2009–2010)
The GranTurismo MC is the racing version of the GranTurismo S developed to compete in the FIA GT4 European Cup and is based on the Maserati MC concept. The car included a 6-point racing harness,  fuel tank,  front and  rear brake discs with 6-piston calipers at the front and 4-piston calipers at the rear, 18-inch racing wheels with 305/645/18 front and 305/680/18 rear tyres, carbon fibre bodywork and lexan windows throughout along with a race interior. The car shares the 4.7-litre V8 engine from the GranTurismo S but is tuned to generate a maximum power output of  along with the 6-speed automated manual transmission.

The GranTurismo MC was unveiled at the Paul Ricard Circuit in France. It went on sale in October, 2009 through the Maserati Corse programme. 15 GranTurismo MC racecars were developed, homologated for the European Cup and National Endurance Series, one of which was taken to be raced by GT motorsport organization Cool Victory in Dubai in January, 2010.

GranTurismo MC Sport Line (2009–2019)

Introduced in 2008, the GranTurismo MC Sport Line is a customisation programme based on the GranTurismo MC concept. Changes include front and rear carbon-fibre spoilers, carbon-fibre mirror housings and door handles, 20-inch wheels, carbon-fibre interior (steering wheel rim, paddle shifters, instrument panel, dashboard, door panels), stiffer springs, shock absorbers and anti-roll bars with custom Maserati Stability Programme software and  lower height than GranTurismo S. The programme was initially offered for the GranTurismo S only, with the product line expanded to all GranTurismo variants and eventually all Maserati vehicles in 2009.

GranTurismo Sport (2012–2019)

Replacing both the GranTurismo S and S Automatic, the Granturismo Sport was unveiled in March 2012 at the Geneva Motor Show.

The Sport features a unique MC Stradale-inspired front fascia, new headlights and new, sportier steering wheel and seats. The ZF six-speed automatic gearbox is now standard, while the six-speed automated manual transaxle is available as an option. The latter has steering column-mounted paddle-shifters, a feature that's optional with the automatic gearbox.

GranTurismo MC Stradale (2011–2015)

In September 2010, Maserati announced plans to unveil a new version of the GranTurismo - the MC Stradale - at the 2010 Paris Motor Show. It is also 110 kg lighter (1,670 kg dry weight) from the GranTurismo, and more aerodynamic than any previous GranTurismo model - all with the same fuel consumption as the regular GranTurismo. In addition to two air intakes in the bonnet, the MC Stradale also receives a new front splitter and rear air dam for better aerodynamics, downforce, and improved cooling of carbon-ceramic brakes and engine. The body modifications make the car  longer.

The MC Race Shift 6-speed robotised manual gearbox (which shares its electronics and some of its hardware from the Ferrari 599 GTO) usually operates in an "auto" mode, but the driver can switch this to 'sport' or 'race' (shifting happening in 60 milliseconds in 'race' mode), which affects gearbox operations, suspension, traction control, and even the sound of the engine.

The push for the Maserati GranTurismo MC Stradale came from existing Maserati customers who wanted a road-legal super sports car that looked and felt like the GT4, GTD, and Trofeo race cars. It has been confirmed by the Maserati head office that only 497 units of 2-seater MC Stradales were built in total from 2011 to 2013 in the world, Europe: 225 units, China: 45 units, Hong Kong: 12, Taiwan: 23 units, Japan: 33 units, Indonesia :6 units, Oceania: 15 units and 138 units in other countries.

US market MC's do not have the "Stradale" part of the name, and they are sold with a fully automatic six-speed transmission rather than the one available in the rest of the world. US market cars also do not come with carbon fibre lightweight seats like the rest of the world.

The MC Stradale's suspension is 8% stiffer and the car rides slightly lower than the GranTurismo S following feedback from racing drivers who appreciated the better grip and intuitive driving feel of the lower profile. Pirelli has custom-designed extra-wide 20-inch P Zero Corsa tyres to fit new flow-formed alloy wheels.

The Brembo braking system with carbon-ceramic discs weighs around 60% less than the traditional system with steel discs. The front is equipped with 380 x 34 mm ventilated discs, operated by a 6 piston caliper. The rear discs measure 360 x 32 mm with four-piston calipers.

At the 2013 Geneva Motor Show, an update to the GranTurismo MC Stradale was unveiled. All models were built at the historic factory in viale Ciro Menotti in Modena.

GranCabrio I (2010–2019)

The GranCabrio (GranTurismo Convertible in the United States and Canada) is a convertible version of the GranTurismo S Automatic, equipped with a canvas folding roof. The GranCabrio retains the four seat configuration of the GranTurismo coupé, and is thus Maserati's first ever four-seater convertible.

The GranCabrio was unveiled at the 2009 Frankfurt Motor Show, with production beginning in 2010. It is built in the Viale Ciro Menotti Maserati factory. European sales were to begin in February 2010, with the United States receiving its first cars a month later. Planned sales for 2010 were 2,100 units, of which two-thirds were intended to go stateside.

About 11,715 units of the convertible model were produced.

GranCabrio Sport (2011–2019)

At the 2011 Geneva Motor Show, Maserati unveiled a new version of the GranCabrio, with an enhanced level of performance and handling. This version also has the 4.7-litre V8, coupled with the ZF six-speed automatic transmission and fitted with the slightly uprated  version of the V8 engine, with  torque. To hint at the car's more sporting nature, the headlights have black surrounds and other details such as the bars in the grille are also finished in black. There are also larger side skirts as well as tiny winglets on the lower front corners. New front bumper and air splitter substantially lower drag coefficient from original .

GranCabrio Fendi

The Fendi is a version of the GranCabrio designed by Silvia Venturini Fendi. It was unveiled at the 2011 Frankfurt Motor Show.

GranCabrio MC (2013–2019)

The GranCabrio MC four-seater open-top is  longer than GranCabrio with front end inspired directly by MC Stradale and equipped with much improved aerodynamics compared to standard models. The only transmission is an MC Auto Shift, 6-speed ZF automatic. Wheels are 20 inch MC Design units. It premiered on 27 September 2012 at the Paris Motor Show.

One-offs and special editions

Touring Sciàdipersia 
Debuted by Carrozzeria Touring Superleggera in March 2018 at Geneva Motor Show, the car was based on the Maserati GranTurismo and inspired by the original Maserati 5000 GT Shah of Persia.

Touring Sciàdipersia Cabriolet 
The car was introduced by Carrozzeria Touring Superleggera at the Geneva Motor Show in March 2019 and was based on the Maserati GranCabrio. A total of 15 Coupés and Cabriolets are to be manufactured, with reportedly only one Coupé manufactured and the remaining 14 being Cabriolets.

GranTurismo Zéda 
It's the final production example of the first generation GranTurismo. It was presented painted in a gradient of blue, black and white colours.

Specifications
Like on the Quattroporte the engine is pushed back beyond the front wheel's centerline, inside the wheelbase—in the front mid-engine, rear-wheel-drive layout. This confers a 49%/51% front/rear weight distribution to automatic transmission cars. "MC SportShift" automated manual transmission variants have a further rear-biased 47%/53% weight distribution, due to the gearbox mounted at the rear with the differential—in the transaxle layout.

The chassis is made of stamped and boxed steel sections, and is complemented by two aluminium subframes: one at the front supporting the engine and providing suspension attaching points, and a tubular one at the rear supporting both suspension and differential (or the entire transmission in transaxle cars). Structural body panels are steel, the bonnet is aluminium and the boot lid is a single sheet moulding compound piece.

The suspension system consists of unequal length control arms with forged aluminium arms and cast aluminium uprights, coil springs and anti-roll bars on both axles. Dampers are either fixed-rate and set up for handling or "Skyhook" adaptive. The Skyhook system uses aluminium-bodied gas dampers, allowing automatic and continuous damping rate adjustment by means of proportioning valves.

Engines
The engines are from Ferrari/Maserati F136 V8 family.

Transmissions
Depending on the model, two transmissions were available on the GranTurismo and GranCabrio: a conventional torque converter 6-speed automatic or a 6-speed automated manual gearbox.

As on the Quattroporte, the automatic transmission is a 6HP26 unit supplied by ZF.
This transmission includes Auto Normal Mode, Auto Sports Mode, Auto ICE Mode, and Manual Mode. Auto Normal mode shifts gears automatically at low rpm to achieve the most comfortable ride and at higher rpm when driving style becomes more sporty. AutoSport Mode changes gears 40% faster than in Normal Mode, downshifts when lifting off as a corner approaches; then it activates the stability control, stiffening Skyhook suspension, and opening exhaust valves when the engine is over 3,000 rpm (in the GranTurismo S Automatic). Auto ICE mode is for low-grip conditions; it reduces maximum torque at the wheel, prevents 1st gear starts, and only allows gear changes below 1,000 rpm.

The automated manual transmission includes Manual Normal and Manual Sport, Manual Sport with MC-Shift, Auto Normal, Auto Sport, Auto ICE modes.

Performance

GranTurismo II (M189, 2023~present)

The second generation of Maserati GranTurismo was revealed online in October 2022.

The second-generation GranTurismo will come in full-electric, as well as petrol, using Maserati's Nettuno V6 engine'. It will share many of its details with the smaller sports car, the MC20, and the mid-size SUV, Grecale, including similar look and engine.

References

External links

 Pininfarina pages: Maserati GranTurismo, Maserati GranCabrio
Maserati pages: GC, GCS, GT, GTS, GTSA, GT Sport, GTMC, GTMCS, GTMCC
 Maserati GranCabrio Car of the Year 2010

GranTurismo
Grand tourers
2010s cars
Cars introduced in 2007
Cars discontinued in 2019
Rear-wheel-drive vehicles
Front mid-engine, rear-wheel-drive vehicles
Production electric cars